Granville Township may refer to:

 Granville Township, Putnam County, Illinois
 Granville Township, Kittson County, Minnesota
 Granville Township, Platte County, Nebraska
 Granville Township, McHenry County, North Dakota, in McHenry County, North Dakota
 Granville Township, Licking County, Ohio
 Granville Township, Mercer County, Ohio
 Granville Township, Bradford County, Pennsylvania
 Granville Township, Mifflin County, Pennsylvania

Township name disambiguation pages